Sonic360 Records is a British record label founded by record producer Chris Allison in June 2000. Its headquarters are in London with a subsidiary in the US, Sonic360 Inc.

Artists that have signed to the label include Mexican electro-funk rock outfit Kinky. They gave Chris Allison a three-song demo presented on a cassette tape in 1999 while he was producing Plastilina Mosh in Monterrey Mexico. They signed an exclusive worldwide deal with Sonic360 in the summer of 2000. Kinky's eponymous debut album was co-produced by Chris Allison and was nominated for the Best Rock Album award at the 3rd Annual Latin Grammy Awards (2002) and Best Latin Rock/Alternative Album at the Grammy Awards (2002). Their follow up album, Atlas was nominated for numerous awards, including a Latin Grammy Award for Best Alternative Music Album at the Latin Grammy's in 2004.

Sonic360's legendary ‘La Leche’ club party was used to launch the band in the US, with over 600 attendees at the launch party, this was followed by three shows at SXSW. The success of the live experience and the marketing campaign brought the US its first Latin ‘Alternative’ crossover artist, with more opportunities to come.

In August 2007, Sonic360 signed ex-Sudanese child soldier turned conscious hip-hop star Emmanuel Jal. Sonic360 hired the talents of Neal Pogue (Outkast, Talib Kweli) to additionally produce and mix the ‘Warchild’ album. It was followed by a 90-minute documentary ‘War Child’ which premiered at the Berlin Film Festival and won the prestigious Cadillac Award at the Tribeca Film Festival. His Autobiography is published by St. Martin's Press.  Since its release the 'Warchild' album has received an unprecedented amount of press worldwide and still sells consistently well today. Jal performed an electric set at the Mandela 90th Birthday in Hyde Park, London. He was presented to the stage by an enthusiastic Peter Gabriel who called him a young Bob Marley in the making.

Summer of 2008 included one of Sonic360's most significant releases from Walter Becker. Over the past 38 years, Becker and his long-time collaborator Donald Fagen have released 10 albums under the Steely Dan moniker. Circus Money was Becker's second solo effort, produced by Larry Klein.

Sonic360 artists have had tracks placed in more than 100 films, television shows and advertisements. From Nacho Libre to CSI, Man On Fire to Nissan. With a further 100 tracks licensed to third party compilations. In addition to music releases, Sonic360 has a music publishing arm Sonic360 Music. Sonic360 has hosted many events and club nights, (over 150) including the new Latin beats party 'La Leche' which held residencies in New York City, Los Angeles and Tijuana. La Leche, became the first US touring club night sponsored by Heineken, playing New York, Miami, Houston, Los Angeles, San Francisco and Chicago once a month for six months.

Artists
Kinky
Walter Becker
Emmanuel Jal
Los Mono
Brian Buckley Band
BN Loco
Funky C
Acida
Fussible
Panorama
Littl Shyning Man
Granufunk
Kayip

Discography

See also 
 List of record labels

References

External links
 Official site

British record labels
Record labels established in 2000
Pop record labels